Gustaf Samuel Bertil Oscarsson af Ugglas (3 July 1934 – 7 July 1977) was Party Secretary of the Swedish Moderate Party between 1969 and 1974 and a member of the Swedish Riksdag.

Early life
af Ugglas was born on 3 July 1934 in Stockholm, Sweden, the son of commander Oscar af Ugglas and his wife Ingeborg (née Lewenhaupt). He graduated from Stockholm School of Economics in 1957.

Career
af Ugglas worked for Wifstavarfs AB from 1958 to 1961 and Stockholms Enskilda Bank from 1961 to 1969. He served as Party Secretary of the Moderate Party from 1969 to 1974 and as member of the Riksdag from 1974. af Ugglas was a member of the Employment Inquiry (Sysselsättningsutredningen) and served as a board member of Försäkrings AB Skandia and the Bank of Sweden Tercentenary Foundation.

Personal life
In 1966, af Ugglas married Margaretha Stenbeck (later Swedish Minister for Foreign Affairs 1991–94), sister of businessman Jan Stenbeck. A fight between the families concerning the Stenbeck company Investment AB Kinnevik, however, prevented Bertil af Ugglas from meeting his famous brother-in-law very often.

References

1934 births
1977 deaths
Members of the Riksdag from the Moderate Party
Swedish nobility
Place of death missing
20th-century Swedish politicians
Stockholm School of Economics alumni